Piran is a small town in northern Erbil Governorate in Kurdistan Region, Iraq. It is 22 km from Mergasor
.

References

Populated places in Erbil Governorate
Kurdish settlements in Erbil Governorate